All-Out War is an American war comics anthology series published by DC Comics from 1979 to 1980. It primarily featured characters created by writer Robert Kanigher with the Viking Commando being the lead feature.

Publication history
The first issue was published with an September–October 1979 cover date. Joe Kubert drew the cover art for the entire run and Murray Boltinoff was the editor of the series. The series was in the Dollar Comics format and the lead character was the Viking Commando created by writer Robert Kanigher and artist George Evans. Other features included "Black Eagle" by Kanigher and artists Dick Ayers and Romeo Tanghal and "Guerrilla War starring Force 3" by Kanigher and Jerry Grandenetti. All-Out War was canceled with issue #6 (July–August 1980). The Viking Commando later appeared in a two-part backup feature in Unknown Soldier #266 (Aug. 1982) and #267 (Sept. 1982).

References

External links
 
 All-Out War at Mike's Amazing World of Comics
 Daily Planet Volume 79, #23 (May 21, 1979) house advertisement for All-Out War at Mike's Amazing World of Comics
 

1979 comics debuts
1980 comics endings
Bimonthly magazines published in the United States
Comics anthologies
Comics by Archie Goodwin (comics)
Comics by Bob Haney
Comics by Carl Wessler
Comics by J. M. DeMatteis
Comics by Robert Kanigher
Comics magazines published in the United States
DC Comics set during World War II
Defunct American comics
Magazines disestablished in 1980
Magazines established in 1979
Magazines published in New York (state)
War comics